Hermann Höfle (12 September 1898 – 9 December 1947) was a German SS and police official during the Nazi era who served as SS and Police Leader (HSSPF).

Biography
Höfle, the son of a post office official, was drafted in World War I to the Bavarian Army. In 1916 he joined 8th Königlich Bayerisches Infanterie-Regiment "Großherzog Friedrich II. von Baden"; later he served as an observation pilot. After the war he was with the Freikorps von Epp and the Bund Reichskriegsflagge of Ernst Röhm and participated in the Beer Hall Putsch. He officially joined the Sturmabteilung (SA) in the early 1930s. From 1920 to 1934 he was an officer with the Reichswehr and left with the rank of major in the Reserve. He was also qualified as a Spanish language interpreter in 1931. He was married in 1925 and had two daughters.

From August 1934 to January 1937 he was leader of the National Socialist Motor Corps (NSKK) in Munich, director of the NSKK Reichsführerschule from 1935 to 1937 and, starting from August 1937, inspector of NSKK training. He was leader of the NSKK brigade "Ostmark" from June to September 1937, then leader of the NSKK Motorgruppe "Niederschlesien" until December 1941 and finally leader of the NSKK Motorgruppe "Upper Silesia" from 1 July 1943. Besides it led the NSKK Verkehrskompanien in the corps.

Höfle did not officially join the Nazi Party until May 1937 (membership number: 3,924,970) and joined the SS in July 1943 after a request from Reichsführer-SS Heinrich Himmler (membership number: 463,093). From September 1943 to October 1944 he served as HSSPF "Mitte" from a base in Braunschweig. From late September 1944 to the end of World War II, he filled a similar role in Slovakia. In this position he played a leading role in the suppression of the Slovak National Uprising. Arrested by the Czechoslovakian authorities, he was tried along with Hanns Ludin.  Both were sentenced to death and executed on 9 December 1947. However, some sources claim that he died in custody on 3 December.

His daughter, Helga Tiscenko, wrote her autobiography, which included a mini-biography of her father. She confirmed his execution on 9 December 1947.

References

1898 births
1947 deaths
German Army personnel of World War I
20th-century Freikorps personnel
Sturmabteilung officers
SS and Police Leaders
Slovak National Uprising
Military personnel from Augsburg
Nazis convicted of war crimes
Nazis executed in Czechoslovakia
German people who died in prison custody
National Socialist Motor Corps members
People from the Kingdom of Bavaria
Waffen-SS personnel
SS-Obergruppenführer